The RD-253 (Rocket Engine 253) and its later variants, the RD-275 and RD-275M, are liquid-propellant rocket engines developed in the Soviet Union by Energomash. The engines are used on the first stage of the Proton launch vehicle and use an oxidizer-rich staged combustion cycle to power the turbopumps. The engine burns UDMH/N2O4, which are highly toxic but hypergolic and storable at room temperature, simplifying the engine's design.

History 
Development of the RD-253 started in 1961. Preliminary investigations and development of the engine as well as its further production was performed under the guidance of Valentin Glushko and finished in 1963. The RD-253 uses a staged combustion cycle for oxidizer-rich generator gas. It was used for the first time in July 1965 when six engines powered the first stage of the rocket. Development and production of RD-253 was a qualitative leap forward for rocketry of that time by achieving high levels of thrust, specific impulse and pressure in the combustion chamber. This engine is one of the most reliable engines in the USSR and modern Russia.

As every first stage of Proton-K rockets used six RD-253 engines, the system played a pivotal role in Russian space missions when this rocket was chosen as carrier, including the following programs: "Luna", "Venera", "Mars probe", manned orbital stations "Salyut", "Mir" and it supplied several principal modules for ISS. It is used widely also for heavy satellites launches. The last RD-253 rocket engine was used on Proton-K rocket and launched on March 30, 2012.

Since the original development of the engine, several modifications were designed that weren't used in rockets. One of them was the RD-256 engine for which development stopped on experimental models. It wasn't used in flights and was designed for a cancelled vehicle. The modification marked RD-254 was supplied with extended nozzle for work in vacuum.

Current state and development 
All rights to sell and employ the RD-253 for Proton rocket are held by Energomash which produces it in Perm, Russia.

The modification RD-275 (14D14) appeared as the result of development in 1987–1993 years with the purpose to achieve a more powerful version of the engine. The successful maiden flight of a Proton rocket with the new engine was completed in 1995.

Energomash started the development of next more powerful version of engine in 2001. It has 5.2% higher thrust and has the designation 14D14M (RD-275M). It was designed to allow the rocket to deliver  more payload to GEO.

In the period from 2002 to 2003 years some experimental work was completed with this version of the engine. It included four test firings of three experimental RD-275M with a total time of 735 s. In the middle of 2005 this engine went into production by government commission. First launch of Proton-M with 14D14M engines is conducted July 7, 2007.

The final version RD-275M is sometimes designated as RD-276 but through 2009 the name RD-275M (14D14M) was more common. Some sources points out the cost of production per engine as much as 1.5 million USD and sometimes calls some lower figures around 1 million USD per unit.

Versions 
During the years there have been many versions of this engine:
 RD-220: Initial proposal for the N-1 first stage.
 RD-221: Initial proposal for the N-1 second stage.
 RD-222 (GRAU Index 11D41): Development program for the N-1 first stage.
 RD-223 (GRAU Index 11D42): Development program for the N-1 second stage.
 RD-253 (GRAU Index 11D43): Serial production version for the Proton (8K62) first stage. Was proposed for the N-1 first stage.
 RD-253F (GRAU Index 11D43F): Project for R-36M (15А14) first stage.
 RD-254 (GRAU Index 11D44): Project for UR-700 third stage and for Proton and N-1 second stages, it was a RD-253 high-altitude version.
 RD-275 (GRAU Index 14D14): Serial production for Proton-M first stage. RD-253 with increased thrust by 8%.
 RD-275М AKA RD-276 (GRAU Index 14D14М): Serial production for Proton-M first stage. Improved RD-275.

See also 
 Proton - uses RD-275
 Rocket engine

References 

Rocket engines of Russia
Rocket engines of the Soviet Union
Rocket engines using hypergolic propellant
Rocket engines using the staged combustion cycle
Energomash rocket engines